The Córdoba trolleybus system is part of the public transport network in Córdoba, the capital city of Córdoba Province, Argentina.

History

As part of an ambitious municipal public transport improvement program, the city of Córdoba decided in the late 1980s to incorporate trolleybuses into Córdoba's urban transport system.

The Soviet firm "VVO Technoexport" was responsible for the turnkey installation of the trolleybus system, which initially used ZiU-9 trolleybuses, model 682b, manufactured in Russia by ZiU (Zavod imeni Uritskogo, now Trolza).

In 1990, Russian-made ZiU-10 articulated trolleybuses of model 683c  were added to the fleet.  They incorporated thyristor technology, which ensured more effective control. By 1992, Córdoba had 32 conventional and 12 articulated ZiU-brand trolleybuses. The latter vehicles had a capacity of 46 seats and 166 passengers with a total length of 17.5 m.

In 2000, 16 Chinese-built Norinco Shenfeng trolleybuses entered service on the system. These did not last long and were all withdrawn by 2013.

In 2010 a prototype articulated trolleybus by Belkommunmash entered service. The latest fleet renewal occurred in 2015 when 7 Trolza trolleybuses were delivered. These include 5 low-entry vehicles of the type Optima and 2 low-floor vehicles of the type Megapolis.

Companies that have operated the Córdoba trolleybus system have been successively:

 Expreso Emir S.A.: from 1989 to 1993;
 Transportes Eléctricos Cañadenses: from 1993 to 1996;
 Municipalidad de Córdoba: from 1996 to 1997;
 Trolecor S.A.: from 1998 to July 2004;
 Transporte Automotor Municipal Sociedad del Estado (TAMSE): since July 2004.

Lines 
These are Córdoba's present trolleybus lines:

Line A 

 From Barrio Mariano Fragueiro
 To Plaza las Américas

Line B 

 From Barrio Alto Alberdi
 To Barrio Pueyrredón

Line C 

 From Barrio Ameghino
 To Barrio San Vicente

Gallery

See also

Córdoba Metro
List of trolleybus systems

References

External links

 
 

This article is based upon a translation of the Spanish language version as at October 2011.

Córdoba, Argentina
Cordoba
Cordoba
1989 establishments in Argentina